91 Field Regiment (Asal Uttar) is part of the Regiment of Artillery of the Indian Army.

Formation 
91 Field Regiment was raised as 91 Mountain Composite (Towed) Regiment on 15 April 1963 at Ambala Cantonment under the command of Lieutenant Colonel (later Colonel) PR Jesus, SM. It was equipped with three batteries of 3.7-inch mountain howitzers and one battery of 120 mm Tampella mortars. The regiment was later converted to a ‘medium regiment’ and is presently a ‘field regiment’.

Class composition
The unit is a ‘Single Class’ regiment composed entirely of Rajput gunners.

Operations

Indo-Pakistani War of 1965 

The regiment took part in Operation Ablaze and Operation Riddle during the 1965 war. The regiment was deployed near Manawala village in Khem Karan Sector. It was part of the 4 Mountain Artillery Brigade (under Brigadier Jhanda Singh Sandhu) of 4 Mountain Division (under Major General Gurbaksh Singh). On the night of 07 September 1965, the gun position of the regiment was raided by the enemy. In spite of being heavily outnumbered, the regiment held its ground and the raid was repulsed after a deadly fight lasting two hours. On 08 September, the gun position was heavily shelled by the Pakistani artillery and later rocketed, bombed and strafed by the Sabre jets of the Pakistani Air Force. On the night of 09 September, the regiment faced an infantry attack supported by a squadron each of Chaffee and Patton tanks. In this action, the guns were pulled out from their gun pits and the enemy tanks were engaged by direct firing, leading to destruction / damage to 14 tanks. The regiment lost one JCO and three ORs in the action. The regiment joined the main battle in the sector on 10 September. It fired more than 2000 rounds in one night in support of the infantry. On 13 September, Captain VN Bhatia captured a Pakistani armoured personnel carrier and bought it back intact.

For its gallant efforts, the regiment was awarded the Honour Title of “Asal Uttar”. In commemoration of the valiant action, the regiment was awarded a 3.7 inch howitzer as a ‘war trophy’ on 28 September 1989 by the then General Officer Commanding (GOC) of 24 Infantry Division – Major General Surinder Singh, AVSM.  The war trophy has since been kept in the regimental quarter guard and symbolises the heroic heritage of the regiment.
Other operations
The regiment has also taken part in the following operations -
 Indo-Pakistani War of 1971: Operation Cactus Lily
 Operation Trident
 Operation Rakshak 
 Operation Kasba
 Operation Parakram
 Operation Meghdoot

Honours and awards
The regiment has the won the following honours -
 Honour title – Asal Uttar
 Sena Medal – 2
 Param Vishisht Seva Medal (PVSM) – 1 
 COAS Commendation Card – 7 
 VCOAS Commendation Card – 3
 GOC-in-C Commendation Card – 7

See also
List of artillery regiments of Indian Army

References

Military units and formations established in 1963
Artillery regiments of the Indian Army after 1947